Rakell is a Swedish surname. Notable people with the surname include:

Rickard Rakell (born 1993), Swedish ice hockey player
Åke Rakell (born 1935), Swedish table tennis player

Swedish-language surnames